James Peterson is an American World and Olympic figure skating coach. 

Peterson began coaching in 2001 and coaches in Florida. He was the 2009 and 2010 Professional Skaters Association Developmental Coach of the Year making him one of the few coaches in history to win the award consecutively. He also has won the USOCm Developmental Coach of the year award in 2009. His former students include 2010 Olympians Caydee Denney & Jeremy Barrett, Amanda Evora & Mark Ladwig and 2007 U.S. Novice and 2009 U.S. Junior National Champions Tracy Tanovich and Michael Chau. Peterson's students Denney/Barrett and Evora/Ladwig made up the entire US Olympic pair team contingency at the Vancouver Games. Peterson also coached Felicia Zhang and Nathan Bartholomay who went to the  2014 Olympics and placed 12th. They won silver at U.S Nationals to earn their Olympic spot.  He also coaches the current 2016 National Champions Tarah Kayne and Danny O'Shea as well as the Junior title winners Joy Weinberg and Max Fernandez and the current National Novice champions Jonah Barret and Eli Kopmar. He also coaches the Youth Olympic games participants Sarah Rose and Joe Goodpaster.

Peterson continues to coach with partners Amanda Evora and Lyndon Johnston at Ellenton Ice and Sports Complex.

He previously skated with Laura Handy and placed 10th on the junior level in 1996 and won the pewter medal with her in 1997 in juniors as well.
With  he placed 7th on the senior level in both 1999 and 2000.  That earned them a trip to the Neblhorn Trophy in 1999 where they placed 10 before the partnership dissolved.

References

External links

 Coaching profile

American male pair skaters
American figure skating coaches
Living people
Year of birth missing (living people)